Longwood University is a public university in Farmville, Virginia. Founded in 1839, it is the third-oldest public university in Virginia and one of the hundred oldest institutions of higher education in the United States. Previously a college, Longwood became a university on July 1, 2002.

Three undergraduate academic colleges—the Cook-Cole College of Arts and Sciences, the College of Business and Economics, and the College of Education and Human Services—supported by the Cormier Honors College and coupled with the College of Graduate and Professional Studies serve an enrollment of 5,096.

In early April 1865 both Gens. Robert E. Lee and Ulysses S. Grant marched past the north end of campus on Lee's retreat to Appomattox just days before the end of the American Civil War; at the south end of campus lies the former Robert Russa Moton High School, site of the historic 1951 student strike that became one of the five court cases culminating in the historic Brown v. Board of Education decision; and Israel Hill, a community of free Black people formed around the turn of the 19th century, stands two miles from campus.

History

Early history (1839–1884)

Longwood was founded in 1839 as the Farmville Female Seminary Association. Led by Solomon Lea, a Methodist minister who had taught at Randolph–Macon College, the school flourished. Lea left to become the first president of Greensboro Female Seminary (now Greensboro College) in his native North Carolina, and several presidents and name changes followed in the subsequent decades. Led by a number of Methodist ministers, the school offered English, Latin, Greek, French, and piano.

As was common among female seminaries during Reconstruction, Farmville Female College, as the institution was then known, fell into a period of deep financial difficulty. The decade following the Civil War saw many seminaries around the South shutter their doors. The college was given new life on June 5, 1875, with a new charter granted and the college renamed Farmville College. Rev. Paul Whitehead, a minister from nearby Nelson County, Virginia who had been president of Wesleyan Female College at Murfreesboro, N.C., was appointed president. Under Whitehead, enrollment grew by nearly half, topping 100 students in 1876. Whitehead resigned in 1872 to return to full-time ministry.

Normal School (1884–1949)

Farmville College was reinvented once again on March 7, 1884, as the State Female Normal School—the brainchild of Dr. William Henry Ruffner, the first Virginia State Superintendent of Instruction. Modeled after the French École normale supérieure, which had been developed in the late 18th century as a model for teacher preparation, the State Female Normal School is one of the oldest of several normal schools in the state.

In 1902, Joseph L. Jarman was named president of the State Female Normal School, a post that lasted an astounding forty-four years. Jarman reshaped the physical campus from a single Victorian structure to a row of colonnaded Jeffersonian brick buildings that forms the core of today's campus. The academic program was also overhauled: the two-year teacher training program that had been in place since the college's founding was replaced with a four-year college academic program with permission to grant degrees. Jarman instituted the Honor Code, which survives to this day, and the student government. Through still several name changes—State Female Normal School (1884), State Normal School for Women (1914) and State Teachers College (1924)—Jarman shaped the institution into one of the most well-respected teacher preparatory colleges in the state.

During Jarman's presidency, the college purchased in 1928 the nearby estate of the Longwood House, which would become the namesake of the institution in years to come.

Longwood College (1949–2002)

With an expanding curriculum and growing class sizes, State Teachers College was renamed a penultimate time to Longwood College, its namesake being the nearby estate purchased by the Jarman administration. Longwood—with a focus still very much on teacher preparation—expanded its academic degrees, and in 1954 was authorized to issue graduate diplomas. The campus grew quickly in the ensuing years—three dormitories were constructed perpendicular to the core four Jeffersonian buildings: Wheeler, Cox and South Cunningham dormitories all arose between 1959 and 1963.

In 1964, the issue of coeducation arose but the Board of Visitors rejected the notion. The tide swung four years later, when Longwood began to admit male summer school transfers, and then junior and senior transfers in 1971. Men were admitted as day students in 1973, by order of the Virginia Department of Education until Longwood went fully coeducational in 1976.

In 1981, Dr. Janet Greenwood became the first woman president in the modern history of Longwood. She served until 1987.

Dr. William F. Dorrill, president from 1988–96, was instrumental in increasing Longwood's international population and expanding study-abroad opportunities for students and faculty through partnerships with numerous educational institutions around the world.

In one of the touchstone events in the college's recent history, The Great Fire of 2001 burned The Rotunda building on April 24, 2001. The building was undergoing extensive renovations at the time, and no one was injured in the blaze, though the rotunda and much of The Rotunda and Grainger Hall required rebuilding.

Longwood University (2002–present)

Virginia Governor Mark Warner signed legislation designating Longwood a university on April 2, 2002, one year to the day after The Great Fire that burned The Rotunda and significantly damaged Grainger Hall. Then-President Patricia P. Cormier said at the time that "university is a better reflection of the type of institution that Longwood is today. We are a comprehensive entity with a broad array of undergraduate majors and minors as well as graduate programs." Since becoming a university, Longwood has expanded its physical campus and academic offerings.

The 70,822-square-foot John H. and Karen Chichester Science Center opened in 2005. Longwood's Health and Fitness Center, which opened in 2007, was the first higher education building in Virginia to be awarded the gold level of LEED certification. A new 41,983-square-foot Center for Communication Studies and Theater opened in 2009 to house the rapidly growing communication studies major. That building is adjacent to Bedford Hall, home of the art program, which was expanded and renovated in 2012. Three residence halls were renovated between 2007–14: Wheeler Hall (2007), Cox Hall (2008) and Stubbs Hall (2014).

Two residence halls and a commons building opened in 2013 at Lancer Park, an off-campus apartment complex. The residence halls house about 450 students, in addition to the 264 students who were already living there in apartments and townhouses. Longwood has managed the complex since 2006.

Keeping with campus tradition, in 2004 three major campus buildings were named for former presidents. The dining hall was named Dorrill Dining Hall for Dr. William F. Dorrill, president from 1988–96; the library was named Greenwood Library for Dr. Janet D. Greenwood (1981–87); and Lancer Hall was named Willett Hall for Dr. Henry I. Willett Jr. (1967–81).

The academics profile has increased as well since becoming a university, notably with the additions of nursing, environmental science, athletic training, animation and cybersecurity programs, among many others.

On March 23, 2013, Longwood's Board of Visitors introduced W. Taylor Reveley IV as the university's 26th president. Reveley's father, W. Taylor Reveley III, was the president of the College of William & Mary, and his grandfather W. Taylor Reveley II was president of Hampden–Sydney College.

On September 23, 2015, the Commission on Presidential Debates named Longwood as the host for the 2016 United States vice presidential debate, which occurred on October 4, 2016.

At the first home basketball game of the 2015-16 season, members of the Black Students Association, with the encouragement of Longwood's associate director for diversity and inclusion, staged a protest of Longwood's alleged mistreatment of minority students.

Academics

Longwood University is a small, highly residential public university that offers more than 100 majors and minors across three main academic colleges. Longwood is ranked in the top regional universities in the South by U.S. News & World Report. Longwood is listed in the "Best in the Southeast" section of The Princeton Reviews 2015 Best Colleges: Region by Region survey. Longwood also is listed in The Princeton Review's Best Value Colleges: 2014 Edition, the third consecutive year that Longwood was named to this list. The university is also ranked 354 among "over 700" colleges and universities ranked by Money magazine. Forbes ranks Longwood in the top 600 colleges in the U.S. and in the top 175 in the South. In 2005 it was recognized by USA Today as among 20 schools in the country that promote and foster student success.

Longwood is known for active students and emphasis on collaborative learning according to the annual National Survey of Student Engagement review, which scores academic challenge, learning with peers, experiences with faculty, and campus environment.

Longwood requires every student who graduates to complete an internship, directed research or guided field experience in their field of study.

One of the centerpiece hands-on learning opportunities available to students is LU@YNP, an annual interdisciplinary program held at Yellowstone National Park that exposes participants to public issues in and around the park. In addition, students have the opportunity to study abroad at one of many faculty-led intensive study trips to places like Costa Rica, Thailand, and Greece.

Longwood is accredited by the Southern Association of Colleges and Schools.

Cook-Cole College of Arts and Sciences

The largest college at Longwood, the Cook-Cole College of Arts and Sciences houses the core of the liberal arts offerings at the university and offers 18 majors with dozens of minors and concentrations.

 The English and Modern Languages department at Longwood University awards the annual John Dos Passos Prize For Literature, founded in 1980. Notable past recipients include Graham Greene, Tom Wolfe, Shelby Foote, Paule Marshall, Ernest J. Gaines, E. Annie Proulx, and Sherman Alexie. The 2014 Dos Passos Prize winner was Ruth Ozeki.

The college is named for Dr. John Randall Cook '52 and Dr. Waverly Manson Cole, who endowed it in 2006.

College of Business and Economics

Longwood's College of Business and Economics is accredited by Association to Advance Collegiate Schools of Business International. It was originally accredited in 1998 and has been reaffirmed twice. Students of the college earn a bachelor of science degree.

The online MBA program ranked 78th nationally in 2015 and 62nd nationally in 2014 in U.S. News & World Report's rankings of best online MBA programs. The program, which offers concentrations in general business and real estate, was ranked 31st nationally in 2014 in GetEducated.com's biennial "Best Buy" rankings of AACSB-accredited online MBA programs.

College of Education, Health, and Human Services

Longwood's College of Education, Health, and Human Services houses teacher preparation faculty alongside social work, communication sciences and disorders, health, athletic training, and kinesiology programs. The college also offers online speech language pathology courses to prepare students for graduate-level coursework.

College of Graduate and Professional Studies

Students of the College of Graduate and Professional Studies earn a master of science or master of education degree.  A fully online Masters of Business Administration is also offered.

Professional studies offers for-credit teacher licensure/recertification courses, Speech Language Pathology prerequisite courses (SLP Online), and courses for the educational leadership endorsement. A variety of non-credit classes are offered for teacher recertification including partnerships with the Virginia Holocaust Museum and the Virginia Museum of History & Culture.

Cormier Honors College

Founded in 1983 as the Arts & Sciences Honor Program, the Honors College was named for outgoing President Patricia P. Cormier in 2008. Cormier Scholars are an elite group of selected students who mostly live together in a learning-enriched environment and enjoy smaller classes, close interaction with faculty members, increased opportunities for independent undergraduate research and an emphasis on experiential learning outside the classroom.

Tuition and fees
In 2014, the Longwood Board of Visitors approved the smallest increase in tuition and fees of any Virginia public university in a decade, responding to the rising rate of student loan debt, which President W. Taylor Reveley IV called "unsustainable." In 2015, the Longwood Board of Visitors again approved a tuition and fee increase below 3 percent. Tuition and fees for the 2014-15 academic year was $11,580 for in-state students and $23,350 for out-of-state students.

Campus

Longwood's main campus comprises approximately 154 acres (0.62 km2) near downtown Farmville, Virginia, in a triangle bordered by High Street, Griffin Boulevard and Main Street.

The architecture of the campus ranges from its more historic "north core" to its more contemporary southern end organized along a central promenade, Brock Commons. The north core stretches along High Street and consists of four historic brick Jeffersonian buildings: French Hall, Tabb Hall, The Rotunda, and Grainger Hall. These buildings are joined by a covered colonnade and bear the university's signature red roofs.

The rest of campus is organized along a picturesque central promenade, Brock Commons, that stretches south perpendicular to High Street. Located along Brock Commons are the university's dining hall, student union, library, gymnasium, music and arts buildings and the homes of the College of Business and Economics and the College of Education and Human Services. A new student center, the Norman H. and Elsie Stossel Upchurch University Center is under construction on the site of the former Cunningham residence hall. At the south end of Brock Commons sits the Health and Fitness Center, an 80,000-square-foot facility that features an indoor track, basketball and racquetball courts, a climbing room and exercise equipment. It was completed in 2007 and is certified GOLD by Leadership in Energy and Environmental Design (LEED).

Off-campus housing

Across Main Street, a retail/student housing complex called Longwood Landings was completed in 2006. This complex housed the university's bookstore until 2018.

Lancer Park (formerly known as Stanley Park) sits north of the main campus and includes several athletic fields and facilities, two residence halls and several townhouse and apartment buildings. It is accessible from the main campus by pedestrian bridges.

Longwood Village consists of eight buildings 2.5 miles away from main campus that house 380 sophomores, juniors and seniors living in three-bedroom apartments.

Longwood Center for the Visual Arts

The art museum of Longwood University, Longwood Center for the Visual Arts, or LCVA as it is more commonly known, was established in 1978 to house the university's substantial museum collections and further foster an appreciation of art among the student body. The LCVA moved into its current home on Main Street, just off main campus, in 1993. Annually it serves more than 38,000 children, adults and students, who enjoy its exhibitions, workshops and lectures.

In 2014, the LCVA formalized an agreement to assume control of the Folk Art Society of America. In the agreement, the LCVA will serve as a repository for an invaluable collection of primary Folk Art source material, publish its annual magazine, and manage its growing ranks of several hundred members. The LCVA currently holds an impressive collection of folk art.

In addition to operating the museum, the LCVA partners with several regional school systems to supplement art education.

The director of the LCVA is Rachel Talent Ivers.

Hull Springs Farm

Longwood also operates Hull Springs Farm, a 662-acre plantation on two tributaries of the Potomac River in Westmoreland County, Virginia. The plantation was bequeathed to Longwood by Mary Farley Ames Lee, class of 1938, in 1999. It is currently the site of several environmental and archaeological research studies.

Sustainability

Longwood annually saves about $4.5 million in fuel costs by using woody biomass (sawdust). Nearly all of the campus' heat and hot water are provided by burning woody biomass, mostly pine and some hardwood, which is a byproduct from local sawmills. Longwood is the only public institution of higher education in Virginia and one of only two state agencies that burns biomass for heating fuel, which the university has done since 1983.

Longwood has been voted one of the greenest campuses in terms of sustainability in the Southeast by Blue Ridge Outdoors Magazine.

Longwood House

Southeast of the university's main campus is the Longwood House, a home built in 1811 but was burned and rebuilt in 1815 by Nathaniel E. Venable. The estate on which the home sits is the historic home of the Venable and Barber families and the namesake of the university. Confederate Gen. Joseph E. Johnston was born in a house on the estate that no longer exists. The estate was purchased in 1928 by the State Teachers College and has been used as the home of the Longwood president since 1969.

Athletics

Longwood University's 14 varsity athletics programs, known as the Lancers, compete at the NCAA Division I level. Thirteen of those teams compete in the Big South Conference, while field hockey is a member of the Mid-American Conference.

Longwood has six varsity men's teams, including baseball, basketball, cross country, golf, soccer and tennis. Longwood's eight women's sports include basketball, cross country, field hockey, golf, lacrosse, soccer, softball and tennis.
The program has produced a number of professional athletes, most notably Jerome Kersey (NBA), Michael Tucker (MLB), and Tina Barrett (LPGA), all of whom were part of the school's inaugural Athletics Hall of Fame Class in 2006. Alumnus Mark Montgomery is also currently a relief pitcher in the New York Yankees organization.

The Longwood softball program won Big South Championships in 2013, 2015, and 2016, three of their first four years of conference membership. The Lancers earned an automatic bid to an NCAA Regional all three times, becoming Longwood's first program in the Division I era to reach the NCAA postseason. They won one game in the 2015 tournament, and two in 2016.  The men's basketball program won the 2022 Big South Conference tournament and a bid to the 2022 NCAA Division I men's basketball tournament.

Club sports

Longwood also has many club sports, including rugby, baseball, football, men's lacrosse, roller hockey, golf, and others. The Men's Rugby Team took 3rd place in USA Rugby's Division 3 National Tournament in 2007, and again in 2009. In 2011 Men's Rugby won the National Championship. The 2010-2011 season ended with the Lancers ranked #1 in the nation for Division III schools. They beat Occidental College (CA) in the National Championship by the score of 36-27 on May 1 in Virginia Beach, VA. The National Championship is the school's first. The club baseball team in their second year of competition made it to the Division II club baseball world series in Johnstown, PA. They went 2-2 and finished 4th.

Student life

Located in Farmville, Virginia, Longwood is within 65 miles of three of Virginia's urban centers: Richmond (65 miles), Charlottesville (60 miles) and Lynchburg (45 miles). In addition to existing adjacent to one of Southside Virginia's historic downtowns, there are several outdoors opportunities available to students. The 31-mile High Bridge Trail is a short walk from campus, and the centerpiece of the path, the nearly half-mile long High Bridge is just four miles from campus and easily accessible by bicycle or foot. The Appomattox River, a popular canoeing destination, also runs a short walk from campus. The Appalachian Trail is a short drive west, and there are several golf courses nearby.

Greek life

Known as the mother of sororities, Longwood is the birthplace of four national sororities: Kappa Delta in 1897, Sigma Sigma Sigma in 1898, Zeta Tau Alpha in 1898 and Alpha Sigma Alpha in 1901. Today, twenty Greek organizations operate on campus.

Secret societies

Longwood is home to two secret societies: CHI and Princeps.

CHI was founded on October 15, 1900, and serves to promote the Longwood spirit. Members are secretly tapped and revealed only at the conclusion of their senior year during the annual CHI Burning, a large burning held on campus. CHI members at times leave "CHI droppings" on campus, and it is considered rare for someone to find one. Members of CHI, hidden beneath blue robes, occasionally process through campus in what are known as "CHI walks." CHI is represented around campus by an image of the Rotunda painted on the sidewalk. It is considered bad luck to step on the CHI symbol.

Princeps was founded on seven principles of leadership and also keeps member identities secret until a revealing their senior year. The organization honors academically successful students each year by posting their symbol—a seven-pointed crown—on the residence hall doors of each student who makes the dean's or president's list. Princeps' crown symbol also appears on campus sidewalks, but it is considered good luck to step or jump on the symbol before exams.

Joan of Arc

Longwood adopted a patron hero, Joan of Arc. The university's three prized sculptures of the 15th century French heroine are Jeanne d'Arc, known affectionately as "Joanie on the Stony", an 1870 plaster statue by French sculptor Henri-Michel-Antoine Chapu; Anna Hyatt Huntington's 1915 bronze Joan of Arc equestrian statue, nicknamed "Joanie on the Pony"; and Alexander Stoddart's heroic monument, dedicated on November 9, 2018.

In October 2009, Joanie on the Pony was vandalized. After being restored, she was placed in The Rotunda (Longwood University) in April 2010.

Notable alumni

See also
List of presidents of Longwood University
Farmville fire department

References

External links
 
 Longwood Athletics website

  
Former women's universities and colleges in the United States
Public universities and colleges in Virginia
Universities and colleges accredited by the Southern Association of Colleges and Schools
American Association of State Colleges and Universities
Educational institutions established in 1839
1839 establishments in Virginia
Education in Prince Edward County, Virginia
Tourist attractions in Prince Edward County, Virginia
Buildings and structures in Prince Edward County, Virginia